Eddie Creatchman (February 27, 1928 – March 9, 1994) was a Canadian professional wrestling manager. He was known as Eddie "The Brain" Creatchman, manager of wrestlers such as The Sheik, The Great Samu and Steve Strong.

Professional wrestling career
Creatchman began his professional wrestling career in the late 1940s. He was first a wrestler, then a referee and later became a wrestling manager.

As a manager, Creatchman's character was known for wearing sunglasses, smoking a cigar, and wearing a Star of David. Creatchman helped promote his wrestlers who could not handle themselves in interviews. He is best known for his time on the Quebec independent wrestling circuit, where he managed The Sheik and Abdullah the Butcher. While managing The Sheik in 1970, he caused a riot at the Montreal Forum, and as a result, an impressed Sheik brought Creatchman to Detroit to continue managing him.

In the 1980s, Creatchman served as the manager for Steve Strong in Montreal-based International Wrestling as Strong brawled with the likes of Abdullah the Butcher and Rick Martel. Also in the 1980s, he managed The Great Samu and Sheik Ali.

Creatchman and his son Floyd owned International Wrestling from 1986 to 1987.

Personal life
Aside from wrestling, Creatchman owned a scrap metal business, which he ran with his wife Goldie, who he married in 1949, she died in 1985. His son Floyd Creatchman, who also became a manager, died in 2003 from Crohn's disease. He is survived by daughter Cheryl and grandchildren Joel & Alissa.

Wrestlers managed
Abdullah the Butcher
Don Leo Jonathan
George Cannon
Gilles Poisson
Tarzan Tyler
The Sheik
Sailor White
Kamala
The Sheik Ali

See also
 List of Jewish professional wrestlers

References

External links
Online World of Wrestling profile

1928 births
1994 deaths
20th-century professional wrestlers
Jewish Canadian sportspeople
Jewish professional wrestlers
Professional wrestling managers and valets